Frank Busch (born February 4, 1951) is a national team and Olympic swimming coach from the United States.  He was a coach for the USA Olympic teams in 2004 and 2008.

Biography
Busch was born in Cincinnati, Ohio, on February 4, 1951. He graduated from Covington Catholic High School in 1969.

Busch began his coaching career at age 16 in Edgewood, Kentucky. After seven years in summer league coaching at Brookwood Swim Club and four years of AAU coaching for the Northern Kentucky Piranhas, he joined the staff of the Cincinnati Marlins for the 1979–80 season as the Associate Head Coach. The Marlins won the National Team Championship that season and placed six swimmers on the 1980 United States Olympic Team.

From 1980 to 1989, Busch coached at the University of Cincinnati. From 1989 to 2011, he served as the swimming head coach for the Arizona Wildcats at the University of Arizona. His swimmers won 49 NCAA individual titles, 31 NCAA relay titles, and 2 NCAA team championships. While at Arizona, he also led Tucson Ford Aquatics (previously Hillenbrand Aquatics) to several national team championships.

In May 2011, Busch began serving as USA Swimming's National Team Director, providing the overall vision and leadership for the sport's top coaches and athletes. Under his tenure,  USA Swimming won 31 medals at the London Games (2012) and 33 medals at the Rio Games (2016). In both of these Summer Games, USA Swimming's successful campaigns represented 30% of Team USA's total medal count.

Awards
During his collegiate coaching career, Busch was named Coach of the Year by the NCAA six times, Pac-10 11 times, USA Swimming (in 1998), and the USOC (1998). In 2008, he was inducted into the ASCA Hall of Fame.

Personal life
Busch is married (Patrice).

References

American swimming coaches
Cincinnati Bearcats swimming coaches
Arizona Wildcats swimming coaches
Covington Catholic High School alumni
Living people
1951 births